Zbečník is a village and an administrative part of Hronov in the Hradec Králové Region of the Czech Republic,

Geography
Zbečník is located about 5 km from the border with Poland. The village stretches along the main road through the Zbečník Stream valley.

History
The first written mention of Zbečník is from 1422. It was probably founded together with a fortress on the hill Kvikov in the 14th or 15th century.

See also
Jírova hill

References

External links
Zbečník náš domov 
Osadní výbor Zbečník 

Populated places in Náchod District
Hronov
Neighbourhoods in the Czech Republic